The Department of the Gulf was a command of the United States Army in the nineteenth and early twentieth centuries and of the Confederate States Army during the Civil War.

History

United States Army (Civil War)

Creation

The department was constituted on February 23, 1862 when the United States War Department issued General Orders No. 20; the department consisted of "...all of the coast of the Gulf of Mexico west of Pensacola harbor, and so much of the Gulf States as may be occupied by the forces under Major General B.F. Butler." On March 20, 1862, Butler activated his command at Ship Island, Mississippi by issuing General Orders No. 1 (Department of the Gulf) assuming his new command.

Activities
United States Navy's West Gulf Blockading Squadron captured New Orleans, Louisiana on April 29, 1862, Butler moved his headquarters to New Orleans on 1 May. The department, sometimes referred to as the Army of the Gulf, became a union occupying force in the region.

Commanders
Major General B. F. Butler, March 20, 1862 – December 17, 1862
Major General N. P. Banks, December 17, 1862 – September 23, 1864
Major General S. G. Hurlbut, September 23, 1864 – to April 22, 1865
Major General N. P. Banks, 22 April 22, 1865 – June 3, 1865
Major General E. R. S. Canby, June 3, 1865 –

Confederate States Army

Organization
The department, frequently referred to as the Gulf District, was established on July 2, 1862 as a part of Department No. 2; its area was defined as the coast from the Pearl River to the Apalachicola River northward to latitude 32° north. On November 3, 1863, the northern boundary was extended to latitude 33° north. On July 25, 1863, the department/district was transferred to the Department of Mississippi and Eastern Louisiana. It remained in that department only until January 28, 1864, when it was transferred to the Department of Alabama and Eastern Mississippi. Upon being transferred, the department/district boundaries were redefined as beginning at the mouth of the Pearl River, running north to latitude 32° north, east to the Georgia State line and south to the Gulf of Mexico. On May 8, 1864, the boundary was again modified to define the eastern edge as being the intersection of latitude 32° north with a line running from the junction of the Coosa and Tallapoosa to point where the Choctawhatchee River entered Florida then following the Choctawhatchee to its mouth on the Gulf of Mexico. The department/district surrendered on May 4, 1865.

Commanders
John H. Forney, July 2, 1862 – December 8, 1862
William W. Mackall, December 8, 1862 – December 14, 1862
Simon B. Buckner, December 14, 1862 – April 27, 1863
Franklin Gardner, April 27, 1863 – May 1863
Dabney H. Maury, May 1863 – July 26, 1864
Franklin Gardner, July 26, 1864 – August 15, 1864
Dabney H. Maury, August 15, 1864 – November 22, 1864
Danville Leadbetter, November 22 – December 12, 1864
Dabney H. Maury, December 12, 1864 – May 4, 1865 (surrendered)

United States Army (Spanish–American War era)

Creation
The department was constituted by General Order 7, Headquarters of the Army, Adjutant General's Office, dated March 11, 1898. The order specified that the department was to include the states of South Carolina, Georgia, Florida, Alabama, Mississippi, Louisiana and Texas. All of the named states had previously been included in the Department of the East except Texas which had been the sole state in the Department of Texas. The depart was redesignated  as the Department of the South on March 12, 1898 and back to the Department of the Gulf on March 18, 1898. Brigadier General William M. Graham assumed command of the department on March 14, 1898. The department was headquartered in Atlanta, Georgia.

On October 25, 1899, the department was merged with the Department of the East. It was reestablished in December 1903.

Commanders

Brigadier General William M. Graham, March 14, 1898 – May 18, 1898
Major General John R. Brooke, May 17, 1898 – July 4, 1898
Brigadier General A. C. M. Pennington, July 4, 1898 – March 22, 1899
Brigadier General Royal T. Frank, March 22, 1899 - October 18, 1899 (his retirement date)
...
Brigadier General Thomas H. Barry, December 1903 – May 15, 1905
Brigadier General James F. Wade, May 15, 1905 - April 6, 1906
Brigadier General William P. Duvall, April 6, 1906 - February 18, 1907
Brigadier General Winfield Scott Edgerly, March 3, 1907 – July 13, 1907
Brigadier General John M. K. Davis, July 14, 1907 – January 31, 1908
Brigadier General R. D. Potts, July 1, 1908 – December 23, 1908
Colonel George A. Dodd, 12th Cavalry Regiment, December 23, 1908 – January 16, 1909
Brigadier General R. D. Potts, January 16, 1909 – April 24, 1909
Colonel J. T. Van Orsdale, 17th Infantry Regiment, April 24, 1909 – May 28, 1909
Brigadier General A. L. Mills, May 28, 1909 – June 3, 1909
Colonel J. T. Van Orsdale, 17th Infantry Regiment, June 3, 1909 – June 27, 1909
Brigadier General A. L. Mills, June 27, 1909 - January 15, 1912
Brigadier General William W. Wotherspoon, January 15, 1912 - August 17, 1912
Brigadier General Robert K. Evans, August 17, 1912 - March 1914

References

Further reading

Proclamation, Headquarters, Department of the Gulf, New Orleans, May 1st, 1862

External links
Map of the military Department of the Gulf
Civil War - Use Withheld from Grant 
Constitution during the Civil War
Department of the Gulf from Ohio Civil War
NYPL Blog of Sanitary Commission
The Civil War in Louisiana
153rd NY Infantry Regiment
The photographic history of the Civil War, Volume 10
Department of the Gulf Reenactors
Dept of the Gulf, CSA
Use of Negros by CSA
History Part IX
The Confederate Soldier in the Civil War, 1861-1865

Gulf
Government agencies established in 1898
1862 establishments in the United States